Major-General Sir David Calthrop Thorne KBE CVO (13 December 1933 – 23 April 2000) was a British Army officer who commanded 1st Armoured Division.

Early life
Educated at St Edward's School, Oxford, and the Royal Military Academy Sandhurst, Thorne was commissioned into the Royal Norfolk Regiment in 1952. He was a keen cricketer and played two first-class matches for the Combined Services cricket team in 1964. He also played minor counties matches for Norfolk from 1954 to 1962, as did his twin brother, Michael (1955–1958), and uncle, Gordon Thorne (1914–1925).

Military career
Thorne was given command of the 1st Battalion, Royal Anglian Regiment in 1972. He was appointed Commander of 3rd Infantry Brigade in Northern Ireland during Operation Banner in 1977, in which capacity in 1979 he was the first officer to brief Prime Minister Margaret Thatcher on the Warrenpoint ambush. He was appointed to the post of the British Army's Vice Quartermaster-General in 1981. in 1982 he was appointed as the Commander of British Forces in the Falkland Islands, shortly after their re-capture by the British Armed Forces from an Argentinian invasion in the Falklands War. In that role he gave support to the idea of then-Captain Geoffrey Cardozo to locate, retrieve, and respectfully bury every dead Argentine soldier left dead unattended after the war ended.

He went on to be General Officer Commanding 1st Armoured Division in 1983, and Director of Infantry in 1986, in which role he secured the rejection a proposed reform in the Ministry of Defence for the posting officers which he believed would undermine the British Army's regimental system. He retired in 1988.

In retirement Thorne became Director General of the Royal Commonwealth Society. He died from the effects of a cancer on 23 April 2000 at Framlingham, in the county of Suffolk, in his 67th year.

Personal life
In 1962 he married Suzan Anne Goldsmith; they had one son and two daughters.

References

1933 births
2000 deaths
Royal Anglian Regiment officers
British Army major generals
Knights Commander of the Order of the British Empire
Royal Norfolk Regiment officers
People educated at St Edward's School, Oxford
Commanders of the Royal Victorian Order
Graduates of the Royal Military Academy Sandhurst
Combined Services cricketers
English cricketers
People from Hertford
Norfolk cricketers
British military personnel of The Troubles (Northern Ireland)
Sportspeople from Hertfordshire
Deaths from cancer in England
Military personnel from Hertfordshire